Roman decadence refers to the popular criticism of the culture of the later Roman Empire's elites, seen also in much of its earlier historiography and 19th and early 20th century art depicting Roman life. This criticism describes the later Roman Empire as reveling in luxury, in its extreme characterized by corrupting "extravagance, weakness, and sexual deviance", as well as "orgies and sensual excesses".

See also
Decadence
Epicureanism
Historiography of the fall of the Western Roman Empire
Messalina

References

Fall of the Western Roman Empire
Ancient Roman culture